In geology, the slab is a significant constituent of subduction zones .

Subduction slabs drive plate tectonics by pulling along the lithosphere to which they attach in a process known as slab pull and by inducing currents in the mantle via slab suction. The slab affects the convection and evolution of the Earth's mantle due to the insertion of the hydrous oceanic lithosphere. Dense oceanic lithosphere retreats into the Earth's mantle, while lightweight continental lithospheric material produces active continental margins and volcanic arcs, generating volcanism.  Recycling the subducted slab presents volcanism by flux melting from the mantle wedge. The slab motion can cause dynamic uplift and subsidence of the Earth's surface, forming shallow seaways and potentially rearranging drainage patterns.

Geologic features of the subsurface can infer subducted slabs by seismic imaging. Subduction slabs are dynamic; slab characteristics such as slab temperature evolution,  flat-slab, deep-slab, and slab detachment can be expressed globally near subduction zones. Temperature gradients of subducted slabs depend on the oceanic plate's time and thermal structures. Slabs experiencing low angle (less than 30 degrees) subduction is considered flat-slab, primarily in southern China and the western United States. Marianas Trench is an example of a deep slab, thereby creating the deepest trench in the world established by a steep slab angle. Slab breakoff occurs during a collision between oceanic and continental lithosphere, allowing for a slab tear; an example of slab breakoff occurs within the Himalayan subduction zone.

See also

References

Subduction